Grace/Wastelands is the debut solo album from Babyshambles frontman/The Libertines co-frontman Peter Doherty. It was released in Australia on 13 March 2009, in the UK on 16 March, and in the US on 24 March, with the single "Last of the English Roses" preceding it by one week. The album features contributions from Blur guitarist Graham Coxon (who plays guitar on all the songs on the album apart from "Broken Love Song") Dot Allison, Peter Wolfe (aka Wolfman), and members of Babyshambles. Most of the songs have been played live or feature in demo form on leaked sessions.

History
Following famous stints in Babyshambles and The Libertines, Doherty began to play various solo shows throughout the UK. His biggest came on 12 July 2008, where Doherty played a solo gig at the Royal Albert Hall. It was his biggest solo show ever but the solo show wasn't received well. According to the critics "whole chunks of the set passed by as listless noodling, with neither Doherty nor the audience appearing to know quite how to behave". The consensus was that - without a full band - Doherty seemed out of place at such a big venue.

However, on 13 January 2009, NME.COM announced that Doherty's solo album, entitled Grace/Wastelands would be released on 16 March, preceded by a single, "Last of the English Roses", on 9 March. The website also revealed the track listing of the album and credits.

Recording and release
The original track listing included "Through The Looking Glass" but it was replaced by "I Am The Rain" due to it fitting the vibe of the album more. "Through The Looking Glass" ended up as a B-side to "Last of the English Roses."  A preliminary track list for the album also included "Darksome Sea", a song co-written and recorded with Peter Wolfe in Summer 2008, however the song did not end up on the album. Also, the song "1939 Returning" was originally planned to be a duet with Amy Winehouse.

The album was released to positive reviews, despite only reaching #17 in the UK.

Reception

Initial critical response to Grace/Wastelands was positive. At Metacritic, which assigns a normalized rating out of 100 to reviews from mainstream critics, the album has received an average score of 74, based on 22 reviews. Q wrote that the album, while not Doherty's "defining statement", nonetheless "demolishes the charge that his talent has been fatally squandered". Similarly, Garry Mulholland of The Observer wrote that the album showcases Doherty as an "outstanding singer-songwriter and charismatic poet-vagabond".

Though critics were a lot more fond of the record than Doherty's last two efforts, the album did not sell as well as was expected, particularly in the UK - peaking only at 17 in the UK Top 40.

Track listing
All tracks by Peter Doherty unless noted

 "Arcady" – 2:53
 "Last of the English Roses" – 4:59
 "1939 Returning" – 3:10
 "A Little Death Around the Eyes" – 3:32 (Doherty, Carl Barât)
 "Salomè" – 3:14
 "I Am the Rain" – 3:14 (Doherty, John Robinson)
 "Sweet by and By" – 3:05 (Doherty, Alan Wass)
 "Palace of Bone" – 4:24
 "Sheepskin Tearaway" – 2:43 (Doherty, Dot Allison)
 "Broken Love Song" – 3:44 (Doherty, Peter Wolfe)
 "New Love Grows on Trees" – 3:38
 "Lady Don't Fall Backwards" – 2:17

Personnel
Pete Doherty – acoustic guitar, piano, organ, harmonica, vocals, melodica, artwork, composer
Trevor Myers – trombone
John Metcalfe – viola
Stephen Street – dulcimer, acoustic guitar, harmonium, electric guitar, percussion, programming, background vocals, snare drums, mixing, mellotron, producer, tambourine
Peter Wolfe – composer, electric guitar
Dot Allison –  vocals
Sophie Harris – cello
Tom Stanley – engineer, mixing
John Robinson – acoustic guitar, vocals
Andrew Murabito – design, reworking
Dave Emery – assistant engineer
Martin Burgess – violin
Adam Ficek – accordion, cymbals, brushes, drums
Drew McConnell – bass
Stephen Large – organ, piano and vox continental
Alize Meurisse – artwork
Graham Coxon – acoustic and electric guitar
Benny Cummings – trumpet
Sally Herbert – violin
Richard Koster – violin

Charts

References

External links
 
 Grace/Wastelands Review

2009 debut albums
Albums produced by Stephen Street
Pete Doherty albums